Nicholas Gregory Buss  (born December 15, 1986) is an American former professional baseball outfielder. He played in Major League Baseball (MLB) for the Los Angeles Dodgers and Los Angeles Angels.

Career

Los Angeles Dodgers
Buss was originally drafted by the Los Angeles Dodgers in the 35th round of the 2006 MLB Draft out of San Diego Mesa College but did not sign and was later drafted by the Dodgers in the 8th round of the 2008 MLB Draft out of the University of Southern California. He went to high school at De La Salle Collegiate High School.

He began his professional career with the Ogden Raptors in 2008 and was promoted to the Great Lakes Loons in 2009 and to the Inland Empire 66ers of San Bernardino midway through 2010. In 2011, he hit .328 with the Rancho Cucamonga Quakes in the California League. Buss played with the AA Chattanooga Lookouts in 2012 and in 2013 he was promoted to the AAA Albuquerque Isotopes, where he was selected as a starter for the mid-season Pacific Coast League All-Star team. He also made the post-season All-Star team and hit .303 with 17 homers and 100 RBI in 131 games.

The Dodgers called him up to the Majors for the first time on September 14, 2013. He entered the game that night in the third inning as a pinch hitter and remained in the game in the outfield. He had one hit in three at-bats in his debut, with his first hit being a single to right field off of Tim Lincecum. In 8 games with the Dodgers, he hit .105 (2 hits in 19 at-bats).

He was designated for assignment on May 1, 2014.

Oakland Athletics
Buss was claimed off waivers by the Oakland Athletics on May 4, 2014, and optioned to the AAA Sacramento River Cats.

Arizona Diamondbacks
In 2015, Buss played the whole season with the Diamondbacks' AAA affiliate. He hit .296 with four home runs in 92 games for the Reno Aces.

Los Angeles Angels
On December 10, 2015, Buss signed a minor league deal with the Los Angeles Angels of Anaheim. After competing in spring training, Buss opened the season with the Salt Lake Bees of the PCL. Buss was added to the Angels' roster on August 13. He hit his first MLB home run on August 23 off then Toronto Blue Jays pitcher R. A. Dickey.

San Diego Padres
On January 24, 2017, Buss signed a minor league contract with the San Diego Padres. He elected free agency on November 6, 2017.

Minnesota Twins
On January 3, 2018, Buss signed a minor league contract with an invite to spring training with the Minnesota Twins. He was released on June 22, 2018.

References

External links

1986 births
Living people
Los Angeles Dodgers players
Los Angeles Angels players
Ogden Raptors players
Great Lakes Loons players
Inland Empire 66ers of San Bernardino players
Rancho Cucamonga Quakes players
Chattanooga Lookouts players
Albuquerque Isotopes players
Cardenales de Lara players
American expatriate baseball players in Venezuela
San Diego Mesa College alumni
USC Trojans baseball players
Sportspeople from Southfield, Michigan
Baseball players from Michigan
Major League Baseball outfielders
Sacramento River Cats players
Salt Lake Bees players
Reno Aces players
Tomateros de Culiacán players
American expatriate baseball players in Mexico
El Paso Chihuahuas players
Rochester Red Wings players